Richard James Fox (November 8, 1927 – February 9, 2020) was an American property developer, entrepreneur and philanthropist. He served as the Chairman of Fox Companies, a property construction, development and management company in Eastern Pennsylvania and Southern New Jersey, and Planalytics, a weather analytics company.

Early life
Richard J. Fox was born in 1927. He grew up in the Germantown-Mount Airy neighborhoods of Philadelphia.

Fox was educated at the Central High School, a public high school from which he graduated in 1945. Fox enlisted in the Navy to serve in World War II, where he learned how to fly, which became a lifelong passion of his.  He graduated from the Georgia Institute of Technology in 1950, where he received a bachelor of science degree in engineering. He served in the Korean War of 1950–1953.

Career
Fox co-founded Fox Companies, a property construction, development and management firm in Eastern Pennsylvania and Southern New Jersey, with his brother Robert. He served as its Chairman. The firm has developed many buildings, including the Wachovia Center in Philadelphia. Additionally, they developed the town of Chesterbrook, Pennsylvania.

Additionally, Fox served as the Chairman of Planalytics, a weather analytics company., and Quantum Pest Management, a revolutionary, non-chemical, insect management technology.

Political activity
Fox was a co-founder of the Republican Jewish Coalition. He served as its first Chairman, and served as its honorary chairman. Fox served as the Chairman of the Jewish Policy Center. He was the Pennsylvania State Chairman for Ronald Reagan's presidential campaign in 1980, and the national finance chair of Jack Kemp's 1988 presidential campaign.  Fox served as the co-chairman of the New Horizon Council.

Philanthropy

Fox served on the Board of Trustees of Temple University continuously for 53 years. He served as its Chairman for 17 years from 1982 to 1999, when the Fox School of Business and Management was named in his honor. He was the 1996 recipient of an honorary doctorate of humane letters.

Death
Fox died from natural causes on February 9, 2020, in his Center City Philadelphia apartment at the age of 92.

Personal life
Fox was married to his wife, Geraldine for 64 years.  Together they had 5 children and 7 grandchildren. Fox flew planes for 64 years from the age of 17 until he stopped at the age of 81.  He enjoyed politics, Jewish affairs and golf.

References

1927 births
2020 deaths
Businesspeople from Philadelphia
Georgia Tech alumni
United States Navy personnel of World War II
United States Navy personnel of the Korean War
American chairpersons of corporations
Jewish American philanthropists
Temple University people
21st-century American Jews